Gangneung Danoje (The Gangneung Danoje Festival) is a local festival in Korea which is selected as the 13th Important Intangible Cultural Properties of Korea next to Jinju geommu. It culminates on the fifth day of the fifth month of the year according to the lunisolar calendar, in Gangneung, Gangwon Province. However, the festival, including preparations such as making special alcohol actually takes 45 days in total. Danoje referred to Suritnal which means the highest day and the God's day. Gangneung Danoje has the longest history among Korean local festivals and its main purpose is to worship the guardian spirit of a mountain  which protects the town and pray for the peace of the town and all families and prosperity of farming. It is designated as part of South Korea's Masterpieces of the Oral and Intangible Heritage of Humanity by UNESCO on November 25, 2005.

History
Its origin is not accurate but according to Nam-hyowon's record, shaman prayed for the God for 3 days every March, April and May. Also Heo-gyun wrote in his book that he saw the Gangneung Danoje in 1603. 

Heo Gyun personally saw Gangneung Danoje and wrote that the subject of the memorial service was General Kim Yu-shin. After unifying the three kingdoms, Kim Yu-sin died and became a mountain god in Daegwallyeong, and recorded that this god was honored and visited Daegwallyeong every May to greet and entertain the gods. Therefore, if God was happy, he would have a good harvest that year, and if he was angry, he would give a natural disaster, and because of this, all the people of Myeongju gathered to sing, dance, and serve God.

Gangneung Dano Festival has long been a public-centered event and a public-private festival with active cooperation from the government.

Gangneung Danoje was designated as Important Intangible Cultural Heritage No. 13 and is protected by the state.

In 2021, the 13th Gangneung Dano Festival will open on June 10th and run for eight days until the 17th. According to the Gangneung Danoje Committee, it consists of programs that present the direction of Danoje in the post-corona era and Danoje spirit that lasts for 1,000 years.   The meeting will be held in the wake of the prolonged Covid-19 outbreak, with only officials attending.

Procedures
During the Danoje, all the people in town pray for the guardian spirit of a mountain in the morning and the night for 5 days. They also have a shaman ceremony for prosperity of the farming and peace for the town. In the mask playing, the character of noble, young lady, Jangjamari, sisidakdak dance and sing. There are also small events and games includes swing, Korean wrestling, ssireum, the traditional instrument contest, shampooing in a special method, eating ddeok. On the next day of Dano, they burn the sacred wood and the festival ends.

Transmission
The transmission is divided into three way. One is the group for ceremony, one is for shaman ceremony and the other is for mask-playing. Currently Jo kyu-don was designated for the ceremony and the shaman ceremony is maintained by Bin sun-hae and the mask playing is Kim jong-gun.

References

External links

Gangneung Danoje Official website
Korean Curtural Heritage Administration
Korean Culture Information Service
Gangneung Danoje by UNESCO

Korean culture
Intangible Cultural Heritage of Humanity
Gangneung
Important Intangible Cultural Properties of South Korea